Joseph or Joe Powell may refer to:

 Joseph Powell (painter) (1780–1834), English watercolourist, sometimes called "John Powell"
 Joseph Powell (congressman) (1828–1904), U.S. Representative from Pennsylvania
 Joe Powell (Australian footballer) (1868–1945), Australian rules footballer
 Joe Powell (footballer, born 1870) (1870–1896), English footballer
 Joe Powell (stuntman) (1922–2016), English stuntman and actor
 Jody Powell (Joseph Lester Powell, 1943–2009), White House Press Secretary during the presidency of Jimmy Carter
 Joe Powell (rugby union) (born 1994), Australian rugby union player
 Joe Powell (American football) (born 1994), American football defensive back
 Joe Powell (footballer, born 1998), English footballer for Burton Albion